Free Meek is a 2019 true-crime docuseries about American rapper Meek Mill's ongoing battle with the U.S. justice system following a disputed conviction in 2007. The five-part series premiered August 9, 2019, on Amazon Prime Video, and is produced by his record label, Roc Nation and The Intellectual Property Corporation, and executive produced by Mill and Jay-Z. A trailer was released during the 2019 BET Hip Hop Awards ahead of its premiere.

Background
The series examines how Mill has been repeatedly returned to prison based on trivial violations of his parole, by an allegedly biased judge overseeing his case, and probes the problematic circumstances of the original charges, of which he maintains his innocence. The series includes interviews with Mill and his family, along with Jay-Z, CNN commentator Van Jones, Philadelphia 76ers co-owner Michael G. Rubin, Black Lives Matter activist Tamika Mallory, and Rolling Stone reporter Paul Solotaroff. Quest Research & Investigations (QRI), a firm that collects and examines evidence for litigators, was featured in the docuseries after looking at the facts of Mill's case. The firm had previously worked on the docuseries The Case Against Adnan Syed.

Episodes

References

External links 
 
 

2019 American television series debuts
2019 American television series endings
Amazon Prime Video original programming
2010s American documentary television series
English-language television shows
Overturned convictions in the United States
Television series by Amazon Studios
Television series by Roc Nation
True crime television series